Duffield Castle may refer to:

Duffield Castle, Derbyshire, a Norman Castle in Duffield, Derbyshire
Duffield Castle, North Yorkshire, in North Duffield, North Yorkshire

See also 
Duffield (disambiguation)